Aramais Sahakyan (May 24, 1936 – March 14, 2013) was an Armenian poet, humorist, publicist and translator.

Biography 
Sahakyan was born in Artsvashen, Armenian SSR. A graduate of the Armenian State Teacher Training Institute's (now university) Language and History Department, Sahakyan later took higher literary courses at the Moscow Maxim Gorky Institute. In the 1960s he was a publisher for the Armenian periodicals Avanguard and Garun ('Spring,' a literary monthly). From 1970 till 1971, Sahakyan worked at the State Commission of the Armenian Television and Radio. He was better known for his humor weekly, Vozni ('Hedgehog'), where he was editor-in-chief for over 30 years (1982–2013).

Sahakyan's best-known books are Starlet (1958), Love Age (1959), We Are Together (1964), To Love and to Live (1968), Be Happy (1972), and I Love you (1975). He was a laureate of USSR and foreign awards. His literary pieces have been translated into many languages. After the collapse of the USSR, Sahakyan was a member of independent Armenia's first parliament.

He died, age 76, in Yerevan, Armenia.

References

 Biography
 Արամայիս Սահակեան (1936-2013)

1936 births
Armenian State Pedagogical University alumni
2013 deaths
20th-century Armenian poets
Armenian male poets
20th-century male writers